Example is the second studio album released by For Squirrels. It was produced by Nick Launay. It was For Squirrels' only major label record, as lead singer John Vigliatura and bassist Bill White died when the band's van blew a tire and crashed less than a month before their upcoming album's release.

Despite the death of half the band, the two surviving members chose to release the album as scheduled. The band released "Mighty K.C." as the only single from the album. The song peaked at #15 on the Billboard Modern Rock Tracks chart on the chart dated January 26, 1996.

The album did not gain mainstream popularity, reaching only No. 171 on the Billboard 200.

Travis Tooke and Jack Griego would form a new band, Subrosa. They released an album, Never Bet the Devil Your Head, in 1997.

Critical reception
The Austin Chronicle called the album "a great approximation of early R.E.M. that would fit nicely in a set with the Gin Blossoms, Toad the Wet Sprocket, and Sponge." Trouser Press wrote that Example shows "that [the band] was a vibrant musical force with a fully realized sound and a knack for explosive, out-of-the-ordinary dynamics."

Track listing 
All songs by For Squirrels

 "8:02 PM" - 3:28
 "Orangeworker" - 4:24
 "Superstar" - 3:20
 "Mighty K.C." - 5:39
 "Under Smithville" - 4:35
 "Long Live the King" - 3:15
 "The Immortal Dog and Pony Show" - 4:02
 "Stark Pretty" - 3:52
 "Disenchanted" - 6:44
 "Eskimo Sandune" - 3:03

References

For Squirrels albums
1995 albums
Albums produced by Nick Launay